Charles L. Wallace (July 5, 1871 – February 12, 1949) was an Irish-born architect. He helped designed over 100 buildings primarily in Joliet and Chicago.

Notable commissions

Chicago
 St. Anselm Church 
 St. Clotilde Church
 St. Dorothy Church
 St. Margaret of Scotland Church
 New Mount Pilgrim Missionary Baptist Church (formally St. Mel Church)
 St. Viator Church

Joliet
 Charles L. Wallace House
 St. Joseph's Church
 St. Mary Nativity Church
 St. Patrick's Church
 St. Raymond's Church (original church)

Other Projects in Illinois
 Immaculate Conception Church (Elmhurst)
 St. Alphonsus Church (Lemont)
 St. Joseph Church (Manhattan)

Other Projects in Other States
St. Mark's Church (closed) (Gary, Indiana)

References

20th-century American architects
1871 births
1949 deaths